Murder by an Aristocrat is a 1936 American mystery film directed by Frank McDonald and starring Lyle Talbot, Marguerite Churchill and Claire Dodd. The film was based on a 1932 novel of the same title by Mignon G. Eberhart, with sets designed by Hugh Reticker. It was the seventh of 12 B-mysteries released by Warner Bros. as part of their "Clue Club" series between 1935 and 1938.

Plot summary
Bayard Thatcher, the black sheep of a storied family, has announced that he will leave for good provided the others pay him $25,000. However, they are not that liquid at the moment, due to lingering effects of the Great Depression. That night, Thatcher is shot in his bed but only wounded. As he recovers, his doctor and nurse try to discern his assailant's identity while also protecting him from any attempts to finish the job.

Cast
 Lyle Talbot as Dr. Allen Carick
 Marguerite Churchill as Nurse Sally Keating
 Claire Dodd as Janice Thatcher  
 John Eldredge as John Tweed  
 Wild Bill Elliott as Dave Thatcher 
 Virginia Brissac as Adela Thatcher  
 William B. Davidson as Bayard Thatcher  
 Joseph Crehan as Hilary Thatcher  
 Florence Fair as Evelyn Thatcher  
 Stuart Holmes as Higby - Butler  
 Lottie Williams as Emeline  
 Mary Treen as Florrie 
 Milton Kibbee as Cab Driver

References

Bibliography
 Backer, Ron. Mystery Movie Series of 1930s Hollywood. McFarland, 2012.

External links
 
 
 
 

1936 films
1936 mystery films
American mystery films
Films directed by Frank McDonald
Warner Bros. films
American black-and-white films
1930s English-language films
1930s American films